Paul Tjøstolsen Sunde (5 February 1896 – 2 September 1958) was a Norwegian politician for the Labour Party.

He was born in Nissedal.

He was elected to the Norwegian Parliament from the Market towns of Telemark and Aust-Agder counties in 1945, and was re-elected on one occasion.

Sunde was a member of Arendal city council from 1931 to 1934, and of its executive committee in the periods 1937–1940 and 1955–1958.

References

1896 births
1958 deaths
Labour Party (Norway) politicians
Members of the Storting
20th-century Norwegian politicians
People from Nissedal